The Banner Formation is a Carboniferous period geologic formation in northern Elko County, Nevada.

It is composed of conglomerate, sandstone, and limestone and was formed in connection with the Antler orogeny.

Fossils
It preserves fossils dating back to the Early Late Mississippian stage of the Carboniferous period during the Paleozoic Era.

See also

 List of fossiliferous stratigraphic units in Nevada
 Paleontology in Nevada

References

Carboniferous geology of Nevada
Geography of Elko County, Nevada
Mississippian United States
Geologic formations of Nevada
Carboniferous southern paleotropical deposits